Jose Lezcano (born April 20, 1985 in Panama) is a jockey in American Thoroughbred horse racing. He rides in New York in the spring, summer and fall and spends the winter in Florida. His big break came in 2008 when he won a Breeders' Cup race.

Career
Lezcano attended the Laffit Pincay Jockey School in his native Panama before moving to the U.S. in January 2003 and launching his career at Gulfstream Park where he earned his first win in March 2004 aboard Cloudy Gray. He spent his first season at Monmouth in 2005, finishing fifth in the standings overall.

In 2008, Jose Lezcano won with his first and only Breeders' Cup mount, Maram, in the inaugural edition of the Breeders' Cup Juvenile Fillies Turf. The win also was a first Breeders' Cup victory for trainer Chad Brown and owners Karen Woods and Saud bin Khaled, who were all starting a Breeders' Cup runner for the first time.

Top mounts for 2009 included Eaton's Gift (G2 Smile Sprint Handicap), Not for Silver (G2 Carry Back Stakes), Cosmonaut (G3 Fort Marcy Stakes), I Lost My Choo (G3 Honey Fox Stakes), Buddy's Humor (G3 Pan American Stakes), and Ballymore Lady (G3 Endeavour Stakes).

Enjoyed a career year in 2008 which was his big break, replacing perennial leader Joe Bravo as the leading rider at Monmouth Park Racetrack with 141 wins, then taking the 2008 fall season at the Meadowlands Racetrack. He carried that momentum into the 2009 Gulfstream Park meet and also earned a leading rider title there with 71 wins. Agent Jason Beides holds his book.

Jose Lezcano tied a Monmouth Park record on June 22, 2008, riding six winners – including Coli Bear in the Blue Sparkler Stakes – on one card.

Rode Deputy Glitters, his first Triple Crown contender, to an eighth-place finish in the 2006 edition of the G1 Kentucky Derby. Was 12th aboard Visionaire in 2008. He was second in the 2010 Kentucky Derby on Ice Box.

Won the 2006 riding title at The Meadowlands and carried that success to Florida where he won the Tampa Bay Downs riding title, the same season he captured the G3 Tampa Bay Derby with Deputy Glitters.

Most recently, he rode reigning Horse of the Year Wise Dan to victory in the 2013 Breeders' Cup Mile as a mid-card replacement for the horse's regular jockey John Velazquez, who was hospitalised after a fall in the Juvenile Fillies race.

Year-end charts

References

 

1985 births
Living people
American jockeys
Panamanian jockeys
Panamanian emigrants to the United States